The 2017 Ontario Scotties Tournament of Hearts, the provincial women's curling championship for Southern Ontario, was held January 30 to February 5 at the Cobourg Community Centre in Cobourg, Ontario. The winning Rachel Homan rink represented Ontario at the 2017 Scotties Tournament of Hearts on home ice in St. Catharines, Ontario.  Homan went on to win her third Scotties Tournament of Hearts, defeating Manitoba's Michelle Englot in the final.

The event was held in conjunction with the 2017 Ontario Tankard, southern Ontario's men's provincial championship which was held at the same time. The events are usually held separately. The opening ceremonies were scheduled for January 30.

The Rachel Homan rink, who were ranked #1 on the World Curling Tour's Order of Merit ranking won the event, after having been upset in the 2016 Ontario Scotties Tournament of Hearts by club-mates Jenn Hanna and her rink. Hanna did not curl competitively in the 2016–17 season.

Qualification Process
Qualifying for the provincial Scotties changed again for 2017. Eight teams will qualify from two regional qualifiers (two each) and a challenge round. The top two southern Ontario teams in the CTRS standings (as of December 4) also qualified.

Teams
The event was headlined by the two-time national champion Rachel Homan rink who entered the event in first place on the World Curling Tour. Other top teams in the event included the 2016 WFG Masters and 2014 provincial champion Allison Flaxey rink, and five-time provincial champion Sherry Middaugh.

The team lineups were as follows:

Round-robin standings

Round-robin results

Draw 4
Monday, January 30, 8:00 pm

Draw 5
Tuesday, January 31, 9:30 am

Draw 7
Tuesday, January 31, 7:30 pm

Draw 8
Wednesday, February 1, 9:30 am

Draw 9
Wednesday, February 1, 2:30 pm

Draw 10
Wednesday, February 1, 7:30 pm

Draw 11
Thursday, February 2, 9:30 am

Draw 12
Thursday, February 2, 2:30 pm

Draw 13
Thursday, February 2, 7:30pm

Draw 14

Draw 15
Friday, February 13, 2:30pm

Tie Breaker
Friday, February 3, 7:30pm

Playoffs

Semi-final
Saturday, February 4, 9:00am

Final
Sunday, February 5

Qualification
East and west regional qualifiers ran from December 16-December 19, 2016. Two teams from each region qualified.

East Qualifier
December 16–19, at the Oshawa Curling Club, Oshawa

Teams entered:

Kristina Adams (Ennismore)
Cathy Auld (Dundas Valley)
Megan Balsdon (Dixie)
Chrissy Cadorin (Thornhill)
Susan Froud (Stroud)
Julie Hastings (Bayview)
Heather Heggestad (Thornhill)
Danielle Inglis (Ottawa Hunt)
Cassandra Lewin (RCMP)
Erin Macaulay (Rideau)
Colleen Madonia (Thornhill)
Angie Melaney (Lindsay)
Sherry Middaugh (Coldwater)
Erin Morrissey (RCMP)
Samantha Peters (Rideau)
Charlene Sobering (Rideau)
Ashley Waye (Royal Canadian)

Brackets:

West Qualifier
December 17–19, at the Guelph Curling Club, Guelph

Teams entered:

Kelly Cochrane (High Park)
Michelle Fletcher (Burlington)
Brenda Halloway (Kitchener-Waterloo Granite)
Jacqueline Harrison (Mississaugua)
Mallory Kean (Westmount)
Jackie Kellie (Glendale)
Stephanie LeDrew (Sarnia)
Katie Moreau (Penetanguishene) 
Hollie Nicol (Royal Canadian)
Jen Spencer (Guelph)
Julie Tippin (Woodstock)

Brackets:

Challenge Round
January 20–22, Mississaugua Golf & Country Club, Mississauga

Notes:
Courtney de Winter skipping the Ashley Waye rink.
Lauren Wasylkiw skipping the Brenda Holloway rink.

Brackets:

References

External links

Ontario Scotties Tournament of Hearts
Cobourg
Ontario Scotties Tournament of Hearts
Ontario Scotties Tournament of Hearts
January 2017 sports events in Canada
February 2017 sports events in Canada